Church of Our Saviour is a Roman Catholic parish church in the Roman Catholic Archdiocese of New York, located at 59 Park Avenue and 38th Street in Manhattan, New York City. The parish was established in 1955 and the church was constructed from 1957 to 1959.

In 2015 the parish of St. Stephen/Our Lady of the Scapular merged with the parish of Our Saviour. This included the Chapel of the Sacred Hearts of Jesus and Mary which had previously merged with St. Stephen/OLS.

Building
The church was designed by Paul C. Reilly, who was also known for his design of Manhattan theaters. It was the first church built in New York City that was designed to accommodate air conditioning; the cooling equipment is hidden in the tower.

The church of St. Stephen the Martyr contained a series of paintings depicting the Stations of the Cross executed by Constantino Brumidi, beginning in 1868. Brumidi's Stations have been restored and the frames regilded. In March 2016 they were installed in Our Saviour, the parish church of the new merged parish of Our Saviour, St. Stephen and Our Lady of the Scapular, and the Chapel of the Sacred Hearts of Jesus and Mary.

Controversy
In 2001, Father George Rutler was appointed pastor of the Parish of Our Savior. He reintroduced the traditional liturgies of the Latin Rite and commissioned a church renovation which included icons by artist Ken Woo. In 2013, a new pastor replaced Rutler, Father Robert Robbins, removed the artwork, causing complaints to be aired from both the Catholic and artistic communities. Robbins also discontinued the traditional rites.

References

External links
 The Roman Catholic Parish of Our Saviour, St. Stephen and Our Lady of the Scapular, and the Chapel of the Sacred Hearts of Jesus and Mary website

Roman Catholic churches completed in 1959
20th-century Roman Catholic church buildings in the United States
Murray Hill, Manhattan
Christian organizations established in 1955
Roman Catholic churches in Manhattan
1955 establishments in New York City